Wrights Corner is an unincorporated community in Manchester Township, Dearborn County, Indiana, United States.

History
A post office was established at Wrights Corner in 1853, and remained in operation until it was discontinued in 1903. Wrights Corner was named for Washington Wright, who kept a store and served as the postmaster.

Geography

References

Unincorporated communities in Dearborn County, Indiana
Unincorporated communities in Indiana